Patrick J. Cosgrove was a Republican member of the Wisconsin State Assembly during the 1903 session. He represented the 1st District of Chippewa County, Wisconsin.

References

People from Chippewa County, Wisconsin
Republican Party members of the Wisconsin State Assembly
Year of birth missing
Year of death missing